{| 

{{Infobox ship class overview
|Name=Triomphant class
|Builders=DCNS
|Operators=
|Class before=
|Class after=SNLE 3G
|Subclasses=
|Cost= *
{{ShipCost|FRA|3.1|b|year=2009|r=1|suffix=for Le Terrible'|ref='}}
|Built range=1986–2010
|In service range=
|In commission range=1997–present
|Total ships building=
|Total ships planned=4
|Total ships completed=4
|Total ships cancelled=
|Total ships active=4
|Total ships laid up=
|Total ships lost=
|Total ships retired=
|Total ships preserved=
}}

|}

The 'Triomphant class' of ballistic missile submarines of the French Navy is the active lead boat class of four boats that entered service in 1997, 1999, 2004, and 2010. These four superseded the older , and they provide the ocean-based component (the Force océanique stratégique) of France's nuclear deterrent strike force, the Force de dissuasion (deterrence force). Their home port is Île Longue, Roadstead of Brest, Western Brittany.

Design and construction
The first three boats were originally armed with the French-produced and armed M45 intermediate-range missile, and the fourth vessel, tested and is equipped with the more advanced M51 missile. Each of the first three boats were retrofitted to the M51 missile standard, with the last M45 offloaded in 2016.

Next Generation Device-Launching Nuclear Submarine

In French, these are called Sous-Marin Nucléaire Lanceur d'Engins de Nouvelle Génération (English: "Next Generation Device-Launching Nuclear Submarine"), abbreviated as SNLE-NG. They have replaced all of the  boats, with the last of those six boats being decommissioned in 2008. These submarines carry 16 submarine-launched ballistic missile launching tubes apiece.

This class reportedly produces approximately 1/1000 of the detectable noise of the Redoutable-class boats (submarines), and they are ten times more sensitive in detecting other submarines. Initially armed with the M45 missile, they are designed to carry the new M51 missile, which entered active service in 2010. , an M51 has been test-fired from one of these submarines across the Atlantic Ocean from near France to the west, and is equipped on Le Terrible.

These boats were all constructed by the DCNS, and they carry an armament of 16 M45 SLBM or M51 SLBM missiles manufactured by the Aérospatiale company (now Airbus Defence and Space), plus conventional torpedoes and Exocet anti-ship missiles.

List of submarines
The French Navy's goal is to operate a force of four ballistic missile submarines (comparable with the Royal Navy's s), of which two are expected to be on patrol at any given time.

 Service history 
On 3 February or 4 February 2009, Le Triomphant collided with the Royal Navy submarine ; the Royal Navy boat received damage to the outer casing in the area of the missile compartment on the starboard (right) side and suffered very visible dents and scrapes. Le Triomphant'' was reported to have proceeded to Brest under her own power, submerged, but with damage to her active sonar dome under her bow.

Gallery

See also
 List of submarines of France
 List of submarine classes in service
 Submarine forces (France)
 Future of the French Navy
 Submarine-launched ballistic missile

References

External links

Submarine classes
 
 
Nuclear-powered submarines
Ballistic missile submarines
Ship classes of the French Navy